Cominella virgata is a species of predatory sea snail, a marine gastropod mollusc in the family Cominellidae.

Distribution
This marine species is endemic to New Zealand.

Taxonomy

A subspecies, Cominella virgata brookesi Powell, 1952 was formerly recognized, but the taxon was demonstrated to be genetically indistinguishable from C. virgata virgata.

Habitat 
This species inhabits the mid to low tidal zones and prefers areas where there is less sediment. It can be observed in tide pools, sheltering in crevices or underneath rocks. It has an affinity for Neptune's Necklace and Coralline algae species.

References

Cominellidae
Gastropods of New Zealand
Gastropods described in 1853
Endemic fauna of New Zealand
Taxa named by Henry Adams (zoologist)
Taxa named by Arthur Adams (zoologist)
Endemic molluscs of New Zealand